Intracom Holdings is the main shareholder of a group of multinational companies specialized in IT services, construction projects and defense electronics systems.

Overview 
The core companies of the Intracom Holdings Group are:

 Intrakat, one of the top five construction companies in Greece with 2457 dedicated employees and a steadily growing international presence.
 IDE (Intracom Defense Electronics), a supplier of defense electronics, advanced communication systems and defense applications software, currently expanding into the design and manufacturing of hybrid energy systems.

Listed on the Athens Stock Exchange since 1990, Intracom maintained a strong presence in the Greek and international markets, with 16 subsidiaries abroad while its international activity extends to 70 countries.

References

External links 
L.S. Skartsis, "Greek Vehicle & Machine Manufacturers 1800 to present: A Pictorial History", Marathon (2012)  (eBook)

Software companies of Greece
Telecommunications equipment vendors
Electronics companies of Greece
Defence companies of Greece
Manufacturing companies based in Athens
Companies listed on the Athens Exchange
Software companies established in 1977
Intracom Group
Greek brands
Multinational companies headquartered in Greece
Electronics companies established in 1977
Greek companies established in 1977